Andrea Dawn Anderson-Mason, KC is a Canadian politician, who was elected to the Legislative Assembly of New Brunswick in the 2018 election. She was appointed the Minister of Justice and Attorney General of New Brunswick in the Government of Blaine Higgs on November 9, 2018. She was not named to cabinet after the 2020 election.
She represents the electoral district of Fundy-The Isles-Saint John West as a member of the Progressive Conservative Party of New Brunswick. She was re-elected in the 2020 provincial election.

Electoral record

References

Living people
Attorneys General of New Brunswick
Lawyers in New Brunswick
Members of the Executive Council of New Brunswick
Progressive Conservative Party of New Brunswick MLAs
Women government ministers of Canada
Women MLAs in New Brunswick
21st-century Canadian politicians
21st-century Canadian women politicians
Year of birth missing (living people)
Female justice ministers